Skive station is a railway station serving the town of Skive in Jutland, Denmark.

Skive station is located on the Langå-Struer Line from Langå to Struer in the center of the town.

The station was opened in 1864 with the opening of the Viborg-Skive section of the Langå-Struer Line.

It offers direct InterCity services to Copenhagen and Struer as well as regional train services to Aarhus and Struer.

The train services are operated by Arriva and DSB.

History 
Skive station opened on 17 October 1864 to serve as a temporary terminus of the Viborg-Skive section of the Langå-Struer Line. In 1865, the railway line was continued to Struer.

In 1884, Skive station also became the southern terminus of the new Salling railway line from Skive to Glyngøre, which connected with the ferries to Nykøbing Mors on the island of Mors. Due to the increasing traffic, Skive's first station became too small and had to be expanded. It was decided to build a new station, and Skive's second station was taken into use on September 28, 1888. Its station building was located a short distance east of Skive's first station. In 1924, the new West Salling railway line opened from Skive to Spøttrup.

The original Skive station was a terminal station, and trains arriving there had to end their journeys (terminate) or reverse out of the station. In 1962, however, the station was moved to its present location, changed to a through station, and the current station building was built. The third and current station building opened on 2 February 1962 and was designed by the Danish architect Ole Ejnar Bording.

The West Salling Line was closed in 1966. Passenger traffic on the Salling Line stopped in 1971, with freight service on the line between Skive and Nykøbing Mors continuing until 1977 and between Skive and Glyngøre until 1979.

Architecture 
The original station building was designed by the Danish architect Niels Peder Christian Holsøe. It was replaced by the second station building in 1888, and torn down at the start of the 20th century. The third and current station building was designed by the Danish architect Ole Ejnar Bonding.

Operations 
The train services are operated by the railway companies Arriva and DSB. The station offers direct InterCity services to Copenhagen and Struer operated by DSB, and regional train services to Aarhus and Struer operated by Arriva.

References

Citations

Bibliography

External links

 Banedanmark – government agency responsible for maintenance and traffic control of most of the Danish railway network
 DSB – largest Danish train operating company
 Arriva – British multinational public transport company operating bus and train services in Denmark
 Danske Jernbaner – website with information on railway history in Denmark

Railway stations opened in 1864
Railway stations in the Central Denmark Region
Skive, Denmark
Railway stations in Denmark opened in the 19th century